Mikhayl Assaf (27 October 1887 in Damascus, Syria – 10 August 1970) was the second archbishop of the Melkite Greek Catholic Church of the Melkite Greek Catholic Archeparchy of Petra and Philadelphia in Amman. He was the successor to Archbishop Paul Salman.

Life

On July 20, 1912, Mikhayl Assaf became an ordained priest. His election as Archbishop of Petra and Philadelphia was on 19 September 1948, and his ordination as eparch was on October 10, 1948. In his twenty years in office, Assaf was a Council Father of the first two sessions of the Second Vatican Council. He consecrated Nicolas Naaman, SMSP, as Archbishop of Bosra and Hauran (Syria). He also assisted as co-consecrator of Gabriel Abdou-Saada to Titular of Caesarea in Palestine of Greek Melkites, Georges Haddad as Archbishop of Tyre (Lebanon), Giacomo Giuseppe Beltritti as the Latin Patriarch of Jerusalem of the Melkite Church and Neemeh Simann as titular bishop of Termessus. Assaf was succeeded by Saba Youakim when he died in 1970.

References

External links
 http://www.catholic-hierarchy.org/bishop/bassaf.html 
 http://www.gcatholic.org/dioceses/diocese/petr0.htm

1887 births
1970 deaths
Syrian Melkite Greek Catholics
Melkite Greek Catholic bishops
People from Damascus